Tokyo Apache (東京アパッチ) was a Japanese basketball club, based in the city of Tokyo, Kantō Region. They played in the bj league, the top-level Japanese professional League. Their home games were played at the Yoyogi National Gymnasium II, located at Shibuya, Tokyo.

History

Early years (2004–2010)
The club was founded in June 2004, but their first season in the bj league, was the 2005–2006 season. The team made the playoffs in the inaugural season topping the Niigata Albirex in the 3rd place game.

On June 1, 2010 the organization was acquired by a subsidiary of Evolution Capital Management, a Los Angeles-based investment management advisor.  Conor Neu has been named the Apache's General Manager, while office manager, Daijiro Kusakabe, will continue to face the league for the team.

Earthquake and tsunami disaster relief effort

After the Great Tohoku quake and subsequent tsunami on March 11, 2011, the Tokyo Apache suspended the remainder of its 2010–2011 season.  Tokyo Apache organization and staff then joined forces with Evolution Capital Management and owner Michael Lerch in funding relief projects and organizations.  The combined group, which will also include former NBA star and former Tokyo Apache head coach Joe Bryant as well as baseball legend Bobby Valentine, will contribute over 1 million US dollars to such projects and, as the situation stabilizes, aim to participate in programs that will help the people that have been devastated by this disaster.

2011–2012 season

As of June 7, 2011, the team announced that it will be suspending operations for the 2011–2012 season.  The suspension is due to an inability to secure business partners and sponsors in the timeframe imposed by the bj-league. The Tokyo Apache management noted that the business climate for securing commitments from both current and new business partners and sponsors deteriorated significantly in the aftermath of the earthquake and tsunami of March 11, 2011.  Although the decision to suspend the 2011–2012 season is unfortunate, the Tokyo Apache is committed to continuing its current relief efforts for the benefit of those that were devastated by the earthquake and tsunami of March 11, 2011. As of November 2011, the team was definitely dissolved.

Honors 
 bj league
 Runners-up (2) : 2007/2008, 2008/2009

Notable players
Kohei Aoki
Mike Chappell
Kendall Dartez
Nick Davis 
John Humphrey
Reina Itakura
Robert Swift
Jeremy Tyler

Coaches
Joe Bryant
Motofumi Aoki
Bob Hill

External links 
 Tokyo Apache Official Web site
 Tokyo Apache Official Web site

References 

Basketball.org – Tokyo Apache Acquisition

 
Defunct basketball teams in Japan
Basketball teams established in 2004
Basketball teams disestablished in 2011
2004 establishments in Japan
2011 disestablishments in Japan